Animal Avengers may refer to:

 Animal Avengers, a charity founded by Shannon Elizabeth and Joseph D. Reitman
 Animal Avengers (novel), by Malorie Blackman